Greg DeVries may refer to:

 Greg de Vries (born 1973), Canadian ice hockey player
 Greg DeVries (politician), member of the Montana House of Representatives